Hans Max Huber (28 December 1874, in Zürich – 1 January 1960, in Zürich) was a Swiss lawyer and diplomat who represented Switzerland at a series of international conferences and institutions.

He studied law at the Universities of Lausanne, Zurich and Berlin. Huber taught international, constitutional and canon law at the University of Zurich from 1902 to 1914, and retained this title until 1921 but could not teach due to World War I. During the War, he advised the Swiss Defence and Foreign Affairs ministries. From 1922 to 1939 he was a Judge of the Permanent Court of International Justice and he served as the Court's President from 1925 to 1927, and from 1928 to 1944 he was president of the International Committee of the Red Cross. He also acted as the arbitrator in the influential Island of Palmas Case between the United States and the Netherlands in 1928 at the Permanent Court of Arbitration.

After retiring from the Red Cross and prior to his death, Huber published several articles on international law.

Selected works
  Der Schutz der militärischen und völkerrechtlichen Interessen im schweizerischen Strafgesetzbuch. Verlag Stämpfli & Cie AG, Bern 1913
 Die soziologischen Grundlagen des Völkerrechts. Verlag Dr. Walther Rothschild, Berlin 1928
 Grundlagen nationaler Erneuerung. Vom Wesen und Sinn des schweizerischen Staates. Evangelium und nationale Bewegung. Schulthess, Zürich 1934
 The good samaritan. Reflections on the gospel and work in the Red Cross. Victor Gollancz, London 1945
 Das Internationale Rote Kreuz. Idee und Wirklichkeit. Max Niehans Verlag, Zürich 1951

Further reading
 André Durand: History of the International Committee of the Red Cross. Volume II: From Sarajevo to Hiroshima. Henry Dunant Institute, Genf 1984, 
 Caroline Moorehead: Dunant's dream: War, Switzerland and the history of the Red Cross. HarperCollins, London 1998,  (gebundene Ausgabe); HarperCollins, London 1999,  (Taschenbuch-Ausgabe)
 Daniel Thürer: Max Huber: A Portrait in Outline. In: The European Journal of International Law. 18(1)/2007. European Society of International Law, S. 69–80, 
 Island of Palmas Case (Netherlands/U.S.A), Reports of International Arbitral Awards, volume 2  pp 829–871

External links
 International Red Cross and Red Crescent Movement History - Max Huber (Eng.)
 Max Huber’s Sociological Approach to International Law Revisited
 Max Huber - His Life, biography by Dietrich Schindler from the European Journal of International Law (2007)
 
 
 
 
 

1874 births
1960 deaths
Swiss diplomats
University of Zurich alumni
Humboldt University of Berlin alumni
Academic staff of the University of Zurich
Permanent Court of International Justice judges
Red Cross personnel
Members of the Permanent Court of Arbitration
University of Lausanne alumni
Recipients of the Pour le Mérite (civil class)
Swiss judges of international courts and tribunals